Rhagium quinghaiensis is a species of beetle in the family Cerambycidae. It was described by Chen and Chiang in 2000.

References

Lepturinae
Beetles described in 2000